Stem cell therapy for macular degeneration is the use of stem cells to heal, replace dead or damaged cells of the macula in the retina. Stem cell based therapies using bone marrow stem cells as well as retinal pigment epithelial transplantation are being studied. A number of trials have occurred in humans with encouraging results.

Historical background 
In 1959, the first fetal retinal transplant into the anterior chamber of the eyes of animals was reported. Cell culture experiments on RPE were carried out in 1980. Cultured human RPE cells were transplanted into the eyes of animals, first with open techniques and methods and later with closed cavity vitrectomy techniques.

In 1991,  Gholam Peyman transplanted RPE (Retinal Pigment Epithelium) in humans but with limited success rate. Later, allogenic fetal RPE cell transplantation was tried in which immune rejection of the graft was a major problem. It has also been observed that the rejection rates were lower in dry AMD than that in wet AMD. Autologous RPE transplantation is conventionally done employing two techniques, namely, RPE suspension and autologous full-thickness RPE-choroid transplantation. Encouraging clinical outcomes has already been reported with the transplantation of the autologous RPE choroid from the periphery of the eye to a disease affected portion.

Since 2003, researchers have successfully transplanted corneal stem cells into damaged eyes to restore vision. "Sheets of retinal cells used by the team are harvested from aborted fetuses, which some people find objectionable." When these sheets are transplanted over the damaged cornea, the stem cells stimulate renewed repair, eventually restore vision. The such development was in June 2005, when researchers at the Queen Victoria Hospital of Sussex, England were able to restore the sight of forty people using the same technique. The group, led by Sheraz Daya, was able to successfully use adult stem cells obtained from the patient, a relative, or even a cadaver.

In September 2014, the team of surgeons from Riken Institute's Center for Developmental Biology in Kobe, (Japan), led by Masayo Takahashi succeeded in a world-first transplanting of cells made from induced pluripotent stem cells into a human body. The operation was conducted as a clinical study and involved creating a retinal sheet from iPS cells, which were developed by Shinya Yamanaka. iPS cells are created by removing mature cells from an individual and reprogramming these cells back to an embryonic state. The retinal sheet was transplanted into a female patient in her 70s with age related macular degeneration (AMD), an eye complication that blurs the central field of vision and can progress into blindness. The iPS cells were hoped to stop the progression of AMD. The team used iPS cells made from the patient's own skin cells. Then in March 2017 team carried out the world's first successful transplant of retinal cells created from donor iPS cells into the eye of a patient with advanced wet age-related macular degeneration. Time and cost used in the surgery has been significantly reduced by using super donor cells, cells derived from people with special white blood cell types that aren't rejected by the immune systems of receiving patients. During the surgery the patient received a transplant of approximately 250,000 retinal pigment epithelial cells into the eye generated from donor-derived iPSCs. Results of this landmark study were published in the New England Journal of Medicine.

See also 
 Cell therapy
 Ophthalmology
 Stem cell therapy
 Macular degeneration
 Gene therapy for color blindness
 Gene therapy of the human retina

Bibliography 
 Atala,  A.  Human  embryonic  stem  cells:  early  hints  on  safety  and  efficacy. Lancet 379, 689–690  (2012).
 Bharti,  K.  et  al.  Developing  cellular  therapies for  retinal  degenerative  diseases. Invest. Ophthalmol.  Vis.  Sci. 55,  1191–1202 (2014).
 Bhutto,  I.  &  Lutty,  G.  Understanding  age-related  macular  degeneration  (AMD): relationships  between  the  photoreceptor/retinal  pigment  epithelium/Bruch's membrane/choriocapillaris complex.  Mol.  Aspects  Med. 33, 295–317  (2012).
 Carr, A.J. et al. Development of human embryonic stem cell therapies for age-related macular degeneration.  Trends Neurosci. 36,  385–395  (2013).
 Chen FK, Uppal GS, MacLaren RE, Coffey PJ, Rubin GS, Tufail A, Aylward GW, Da Cruz L. (2009) Long-term visual and microperimetry outcomes following autologous retinal pigment epithelium choroid graft for neovascular age-related macular degeneration. Clin Exp Ophthalmol. 2009 Apr; 37(3):275-85.
 Haruta, M.  et al.  In vitro  and in  vivo characterization  of pigment  epithelial cells differentiated from primate embryonic stem  cells. Invest. Ophthalmol. Vis.  Sci. 45, 1020–1025 (2004).
 
 Mandai,  M.  et al.  Autologous  induced  stem-cell-derived  retinal cells  for  macular degeneration. N.  Engl.  J.  Med. 376, 1038–1046  (2017).
 Muthiah,  M.N.  et  al.  Adaptive  optics  imaging  shows  rescue  of  macula  cone photoreceptors. Ophthalmology 121,  430–431.e3  (2014).
 Nazari,  H.  et  al.  Stem  cell  based  therapies  for  age-related macular  degeneration: The promises  and  the  challenges. Prog.  Retin. Eye Res. 48,  1–39  (2015).
 
 Rosenfeld, P.J. et al. Ranibizumab for neovascular age-related macular degeneration. N. Engl.  J.  Med. 355,  1419–1431 (2006).
 Russell, Peter. Macular Degeneration: Stem Cells Restore Sight in Small Study - Medscape - Mar 21, 2018.
 Schwartz, S.D. et al. Human embryonic stem cell-derived retinal pigment epithelium in  patients  with  age-related  macular  degeneration  and  Stargardt's  macular dystrophy: follow-up  of  two  open-label  phase 1/2  studies. Lancet 385, 509–516 (2015).
 Vugler, A. et al. Elucidating the phenomenon of HESC-derived RPE: anatomy of cell genesis,  expansion  and  retinal  transplantation.  Exp.  Neurol. 214,  347–361 (2008).

References

External links 
 EuroStemCell: types of stem cells and their uses
 Phase 1 clinical study of an embryonic stem cell-derived retinal pigment epithelium patch in age-related macular degeneration. da NIHR Biomedical Research Centre at Moorfields Eye Hospital NHS Foundation Trust, UCL .

Stem cells
Eye procedures
Stem cell research